English electronic music duo Disclosure has released three studio albums, eight extended plays, six DJ mixes, 24 singles and six promotional singles.

Their debut studio album, Settle, was released in June 2013, peaking at number one on the UK Albums Chart. The duo scored their first UK hit in October 2012 with "Latch", featuring vocals from English singer Sam Smith. The song peaked at number 11 on the UK Singles Chart. "White Noise" was released as the second single from the album in February 2013, reaching number two on the UK Singles Chart. "You & Me" was released as the third single from the album in April 2013, peaking at number 10 on the UK Singles Chart. "F for You" was released as the fourth single from the album in August 2013. The single was re-released in February 2014 with Mary J. Blige providing guest vocals. "Help Me Lose My Mind" was released as the album's fifth single in October 2013. "Voices" was released as the album's sixth single on in December 2013.

The duo's second studio album, Caracal, was released in September 2015. "Bang That" was released as a promotional single in May 2015; however, the song appears on the deluxe edition of the album instead of the standard edition. "Holding On", featuring American jazz musician Gregory Porter, was released as the album's lead single. The song peaked at number 46 in the UK Singles Chart. Disclosure's second collaboration with Smith, "Omen", was released as the second single from the album in July 2015, reaching number 13 on the UK Singles Chart.

Albums

Studio albums

Remix albums

Extended plays

DJ mixes

Singles

Promotional singles

Other charted songs

Remixes

Songwriting and production credits

Other tracks

Notes

References

Discographies of British artists
Electronic music group discographies
House music discographies